The Ailik or Aylik Lake (also transcribed as the [Large] Alike Lake) is a lake in Xinjiang Uighur Autonomous Region, China. It is located in the northwestern part of the Dzungarian Basin, on the edge of the Gurbantünggüt Desert. Administratively, the lake is situated within the Urho District of Karamay City, some 20 km south-east of the district's main urban area.

The Ailik Lake is fed by the Baiyang River, flowing from the Saur Mountains on the Dzungarian Basin's northern rim; the river
forms a small delta as it enters the lake.

Due to the construction of the Baiyang River Reservoir and the Huangyangquan Reservoir, and the concomitant diversion of the Baiyang River waters for irrigation, aquaculture, and other economic needs, the Ailik Lake started shrinking in the 1980s; by the mid 1980s, it was just 15 km2 in size and hardly 1 meter deep; by the 1990s, it had virtually dried up.

The lake was brought back to life by the Irtysh–Karamay Canal. According to a report published in 2003, since the opening of the canal on August 1, 2000, the Ailik lake, which had been almost dry, has been able to recover as a deep lake with plenty of fish; now it occupies 50 km2 and is up to 7 m deep.

An important geological feature is the Ailik Lake area is the Kewu Fault, which runs in the northeast to southwest direction, from the Ailik Lake to the Lesser Ailik Lake (小艾里克湖, a.k.a. the Small Alike Lake) and 
the dry Alan Nur lake
(or), which until 1915 was the end point of the Manas River.

Although there is no surface water flow out of the Ailik Lake, some water from this lake is believed to seasonally seep through ground fractures of the Kewu Fault into the Lesser Ailik Lake. Potentially, water can seep through the same fault even farther to the southwest, to the dry Alan Nur lake.

Notes

Lakes of Xinjiang